Pekabeta was a Serbian supermarket chain. All of the "Pekabeta" stores were rebranded into "Mini Maxi" after the chain has been sold to Delta Holding. Now the whole Maxi supermarket chain is fully owned by Ahold Delhaize.

External links
 Ahold Delhaize website

Delta Holding
Retail companies established in 2002
Retail companies disestablished in 2012
Defunct companies of Serbia
Serbian brands
Supermarkets of Serbia